Ansu Toure (born 18 March 1981) is a professional Liberian footballer that last played in the Indonesian league with Persiba Balikpapan, he is also a member of the Liberian national football team

Career

Youth and Amateur
Toure played five years of youth soccer with Genesis Football Club in his native Liberia, before moving with his family to St. Paul, Minnesota, in 1999. He graduated from Park Center Senior High School in Brooklyn Park, Minnesota, before taking courses in sport management at North Hennepin Community College in 2009 and 2010.  Toure also netted 27 goals in 14 appearances for the Minnesota Twin Stars in the National Premier Soccer League in 2006.

Professional
Toure first entered the United Soccer Leagues First Division with Minnesota Thunder in July 2006, and in two seasons with the Thunder, Toure scored six goals and added one assist in 34 appearances. Prior to the start of his second season in Minnesota, Toure played in eight preseason matches during a two-month trial with New York Red Bulls of Major League Soccer. During his spell with the Red Bulls, Toure scored a goal against Houston Dynamo as well as the game-winner against D.C. United. Bruce Arena commented on Toure that he had a nice hard shot and was getting better every week. Despite Toure impressing Red Bulls Coach Arena, he was not offered a contract.

Toure transferred to the Atlanta Silverbacks in 2007, eventually scoring six goals and recording four assists in 19 matches. Two of Toure's six goals last season came in Atlanta's 3–2 loss to the Whitecaps on 10 August. Four days after the Whitecaps match, Toure was traded to Miami FC for midfielder Sean Cameron. As a member of the Blues, the winger assisted on one goal during his eight appearances.

On 21 January 2009 Toure joined Vancouver Whitecaps, signing a two-year contract. He scored his first goal for the team on 9 June 2010 against the Carolina RailHawks.

In February 2011, Toure signed a contract with Swiss Challenge League club FC Locarno. After releasing from Locarno, he joined Danish 1st Division side FC Vestsjaelland on 2 July 2012.

International
Toure has played for the U-14, U-15 and U-20 Liberian National teams. Toure has also received a call-up to Liberia's senior side, but was unable to attend due to club commitments. In 2013, he represented Liberia in 2014 World Cup qualifiers against Uganda and Senegal.

References

External links
 Vancouver Whitecaps profile

1981 births
Living people
Liberian footballers
Liberian expatriate footballers
Sportspeople from Monrovia
Association football forwards
USL First Division players
USSF Division 2 Professional League players
National Premier Soccer League players
Atlanta Silverbacks players
Miami FC (2006) players
Minnesota Thunder players
Vancouver Whitecaps (1986–2010) players
FC Locarno players
Expatriate soccer players in the United States
Expatriate soccer players in Canada
Expatriate footballers in Switzerland
Expatriate men's footballers in Denmark
Expatriate footballers in Indonesia
Persiba Balikpapan players
Liga 1 (Indonesia) players